Between Two Worlds may refer to:

Music 
 Between Two Worlds (I album), 2006
 Between Two Worlds (Paul McKenna Band album), 2009
 Between Two Worlds (Trip Lee album), 2010
 Between II Worlds, a 2015 album by Nero
 Between Two Worlds, an album by Patrick O'Hearn
 "Between Two Worlds", a song from Disney's Pocahontas II: Journey to a New World 
 "Between Two Worlds", a 1998 song by Uriah Heep from Sonic Origami
 Between Two Worlds, a 2002 compilation album by Uriah Heep; see Uriah Heep discography

Film 
 Between Two Worlds (1919 film), a silent German film 
 Between Two Worlds (1944 film), an American film set during World War II
 Delovak Athara, a 1966 Sinhala Sri Lankan film directed by Lester James Peiris
 Between Two Worlds (1990 film), a Canadian documentary about Joseph Idlout
 Between Two Worlds (2009 film), a Sri Lankan film directed by Vimukthi Jayasundara
 Between Two Worlds (2021 film), a French film directed by Emmanuel Carrère
 Between Two Worlds, a Nigerian film starring Kalu Ikeagwu
 Zwischen 2 Welten (Between Two Worlds), a 1999 documentary film by Bettina Haasen

Other media 
 Between Two Worlds: Escape From Tyranny: Growing Up in the Shadow Of Saddam 2005 book by Zainah Salbi
 Between Two Worlds (TV series), a 2020 Australian TV series
 Between Two Worlds (novel), a 1941 Lanny Budd novel by Upton Sinclair
 Between Two Worlds: The Inner Lives of Children of Divorce, a book by Elizabeth Marquardt
 Between Two Worlds (webcomic), a webcomic by Elanor Cooper and JJ Nääs, nominated for a 2007 Web Cartoonists' Choice Award
 Between Two Worlds: My Life and Captivity in Iran, a 2010 book by Roxana Saberi
 Between Two Worlds: Escape from Tyranny: Growing Up In the Shadow of Saddam, a 2006 book by Zainab Salbi and Laurie Backlund
 The Dybbuk: Between Two Worlds, chamber opera composed by Ofer Ben-Amots featuring visual projections by Sherri Wills, 2008.

See also 
 Between Two Words, a 1984 album by Wire Train